One ship and one training establishment of the Royal Navy have borne the name HMS St Christopher, initially after the historic name of Saint Kitts, itself named after Saint Christopher:

  was an 18-gun sloop, originally a French privateer named Mohawk. The people of Saint Kitts, St Christopher, presented her to the Navy in 1806 and named her in their island's honour. She was on the Navy List until 1810.
  was the Royal Navy's Coastal Forces Training Base from October 1940 to December 1944 in Fort William and Corpach in the Scottish Highlands.

References

Royal Navy ship names